is a 2021 party video game developed by NDcube and published by Nintendo for the Nintendo Switch. It is the twelfth home console installment in the Mario Party series, and the second for the Nintendo Switch following Super Mario Party (2018). It was released on October 29, 2021.

The game features five remade boards from the original Nintendo 64 trilogy and a total of 100 minigames curated from previous entries in the series, similar to the Nintendo 3DS game Mario Party: The Top 100 (2017). Unlike Super Mario Party, Superstars can be played with button controls. Upon release, Mario Party Superstars received mostly positive reviews from critics who praised the game for its homage to the series' history with its classic minigames and boards, as well as its online functionality.

Gameplay
Mario Party Superstars features gameplay similar to the first eight entries in the Mario Party series, without the vehicle mechanics from the previous two numbered console games. Four characters, played by either humans or AI, traverse one of five boards in the game, collecting coins and stars. The player with the most stars at the end of the game wins. Stars are bought for twenty coins from Toadette, though can also be obtained via other methods. During a turn, each player rolls a die, enabling them to move the result of the roll - one to ten. Additionally, items may be used to affect themselves or other players. Between every round of four players moving, a randomly-selected minigame of 100 is played. All 100 minigames are taken from the previous entries in the series, 55 of which originate from the original N64 trilogy.

"Mt. Minigames" is another mode, allowing players to freely play minigames without boards.

All playable characters from the first three entries return, while Birdo and Rosalina are added.

Release
Nintendo revealed the game during the Nintendo Direct at E3 2021 on June 15. The presentation revealed and featured remakes of the boards "Peach's Birthday Cake" from Mario Party and "Space Land" from Mario Party 2. Polygons Ryan Gilliam noted that the boards included events not seen in the original versions; moreover, he commented that the game borrowed assets — such as the user interface — from its predecessor Super Mario Party. The presentation also confirmed that Birdo will return as a playable character for the first time since Mario Party 9 (2012). The third game board announced was "Woody Woods" from Mario Party 3, which was revealed on the game's official website. During a Nintendo Direct broadcast on September 23, the final two boards were revealed, being "Yoshi's Tropical Island" from Mario Party and "Horror Land" from Mario Party 2.

A few minigames from the original Mario Party which required players to rotate the analog stick as fast as they could make a return in Superstars; these minigames feature a warning not to rotate the analog stick with the palm of the hand. This was due to incidents where players sustained hand injuries from using the analog stick in this way. Overall, the game features 100 minigames, 55 of which originated in the first three games of the series.

Reception

Mario Party Superstars has an average score of 80/100 based on 88 reviews on Metacritic, indicating "generally favorable reviews".

Mitchell Saltzman of IGN gave a favorable review, stating: "Mario Party Superstars is an amalgamation of some of the best boards, minigames, mechanics, and quality of life improvements from the whole series, resulting in the best Mario Party has been in a very long time."

It sold 163,256 physical copies within its first week of release in Japan, making it the bestselling retail game of the week in the country. As of December 31, 2021, Mario Party Superstars had sold 5.43 million copies worldwide.

Awards and accolades

Notes

References

External links
Official website

2021 video games
Casual games
Mario Party
Multiplayer and single-player video games
NDcube games
Nintendo Switch games
Nintendo Switch-only games
Party video games
Video games developed in Japan